Højskolen Snoghøj is a folk high school in the town of Snoghøj, Fredericia, Denmark.

External links
Official website

Education in Denmark
Fredericia